Debt obligation may refer to:

 Collateralized debt obligation
 Constant Proportion Debt Obligation